Scott McLeod may refer to:

Scott McLeod (rugby union) (born 1973), New Zealand rugby union player and coach
R. W. Scott McLeod (1914–1961), U.S. Department of State official and Ambassador to Ireland
Scott McLeod, British bassist formerly of The Ya Ya's and briefly of Oasis

See also
Scott MacLeod (disambiguation)
Scott McCloud (born 1960), American cartoonist
Scott McCloud, main character of American animated science fiction television series Space Angel (1962-1964)